"Samson and Delilah" is a song by Scottish band Middle of the Road, released as a single in January 1972. It peaked at number 26 on the UK Singles Chart, becoming the band's final charting single there.

Release
"Samson and Delilah" was first released in January 1972 in France with the B-side "Sacramento (A Wonderful Town)". Elsewhere, "Sacramento" had been released as the A-side with a different B-side. "Samson and Delilah" was then released in the Netherlands and Germany in March 1972 with the B-side "The Talk of All the U.S.A.". It was released in the UK on 30 June 1972 with the B-side "Try a Little Understanding".

Track listings
7" (UK)
 "Samson and Delilah" – 3:04
 "Try a Little Understanding" – 3:22

7" (France)
 "Samson and Delilah" – 2:48
 "Sacramento (A Wonderful Town)" – 2:48

7" (Europe)
 "Samson and Delilah" – 2:48
 "The Talk of All the U.S.A." – 3:13

Charts

Weekly charts

Year-end charts

Cover versions
 In February 1972, French singer Sheila released a French-language version, titled "Samson et Dalilah", which became a top-ten hit in France and peaked at number 12 in Wallonia.
 In March 1972, Dutch duo Big Secret released a version of the song as their debut single, which peaked at number 17 on the Dutch Single Top 100 and number 13 on the Dutch Top 40.

References

1972 singles
Ultratop 50 Singles (Flanders) number-one singles
Dutch Top 40 number-one singles
Middle of the Road songs
RCA Victor singles
1972 songs